The so-called Roman Castles (Castelli Romani in Italian) are a group of comunes in the Metropolitan City of Rome. They are located a short distance south-east of the city of Rome, at the feet of the Alban Hills, in the territory corresponding to the Old Latium.

Overview
The area of the castles occupies a fertile volcanic area which has allowed since ancient times a flourishing agriculture. The former crater is occupied by two lakes, the Lake of Nemi and that of Albano.

Starting from the ancient Roman era, it was an area frequented by the noblemen of Rome for its fresher climate during summer: the tradition was followed by the Popes which still have their summer residence in Castel Gandolfo, on the Lake Albano. Families which ruled in the castles include Orsini, Colonna, Chigi, Aldobrandini, Savelli, Annibaldi and Ruspoli.

Municipalities

The Roman Castles are:

 Albano Laziale
 Ariccia
 Castel Gandolfo
 Colonna
 Frascati
 Genzano di Roma
 Grottaferrata
 Lanuvio
 Lariano (a frazione of Velletri until 1969)
 Marino
 Monte Compatri
 Monte Porzio Catone
 Nemi
 Rocca di Papa
 Rocca Priora
 Velletri (a Free Commune during Middle Ages, but geographically considered a Roman Castle)

Cuisine
Since 1996, the Roman Castles area has been home to a large Denominazione di origine controllata (DOC) zone that makes a wide variety of wine including rosés, slightly sparkling frizzantes and both dry and sweet wines. The DOC red and rosés are composed of Cesanese Comune, Merlot, Montepulciano, Nero Buono and Sangiovese with up to 15% of other local red grape varieties such as Abbuoto. The white wines of the region are composed of Malvasia Candia, Puntinata and Trebbiano with up to 30% of other local white grape varieties. Grapes destined for DOC production must be harvested to a yield no greater than 12 tonnes/hectare with the white and rosés attaining a minimum alcohol level of at least 10.5% and the reds being having at least 11% alcohol by volume.

Ariccia is celebrated for its porchetta (roasted pork meat). Local sweets include maritozzi, a kind of sweet bun. From the harvest of wine grapes, wine must is used to bake ciambelle al mosto a large donut-shaped flat cake which can be found in the local bakeries.

See also
History of Rome
History of Lazio

References

External links

 Castelli Romani
 Cultural/tourist Portal of the Castles Roman
 Italy Travel video in English of the Castelli Romani

.
.
History of Lazio
History of Rome
Geographical, historical and cultural regions of Italy
Metropolitan City of Rome Capital